Peter Dasent is a New Zealand born composer, pianist and songwriter who has lived and worked in Sydney, Australia since 1981. He played keyboards in the bands Spats, and The Crocodiles. He leads the chamber-jazz group the Umbrellas, is writing a book on the music of Nino Rota and currently works in music composition for film and television, most notably in the children's television series Play School.

Some of his more famous works were with Peter Jackson in three of his early films : Meet the Feebles (1989), Braindead (1992) and Heavenly Creatures (1994).

He also composed the music of three other movies : Channelling Baby (2000), Cubbyhouse (2001), and Voodoo Lagoon (2006), plus some music for TV series and documentaries.

References

External links

 Peter Dasent website

Living people
New Zealand film score composers
Year of birth missing (living people)